Asperin may refer to:

 The medicine aspirin
 Esperin, a village in Iran